The 1977 election for Mayor of Los Angeles took place on April 5, 1977. Incumbent Tom Bradley was re-elected over nine other candidates. He was mainly challenged by State Senator Alan Robbins and tax policy activist Howard Jarvis, with Robbins campaigning on his opposition to busing in the city. Bradley was widely expected to easily win re-election, and on election day, Bradley won by a landslide against the other candidates.

Municipal elections in California, including Mayor of Los Angeles, are officially nonpartisan; candidates' party affiliations do not appear on the ballot.

Results

References and footnotes

External links
 Office of the City Clerk, City of Los Angeles

1977
Los Angeles
Los Angeles mayoral election
Mayoral election
Los Angeles mayoral election